Wat Anongkharam Worawihan is a second grade royal temple of Worawihan. It was built in 1850 in dedication for King Rama III. The formerly named was Wat Noi Khamthaem (วัดน้อยขำแถม) after its founder Dame Noi, wife of a noble, Somdet Chao Phraya Borom Maha Phichai Yat (That Bunnag), the temple was built along with neighbouring Wat Phichai Yat. It was later renamed Wat Anongkharam ("temple of lady") by King Rama IV.

The sanctuary built in Thai-styled Rama I period, inside there is a principal Buddha image with gold-leaf covered bronze in Māravijaya attitude of Sukhothai styled named Phra Chunlanak (พระจุลนาค) which has been brought from Sukhothai province since 1949. Cluster of the monk's dwellings are decorated with beautiful wooden works. Besides, there are plenty of important Buddha image in the temple compound and the collections of revered monk Somdet Phra Phutthachan Phutthamahathera (Nuam)'s daily-used belongings in a monk's dwelling which will be open for public visit and homage-paying on Buddhist Lent Day and New Year Day.

Within the temple grounds is also home to a Bangkok Local Museum, Khlong San District. The community around Wat Anongkharam is also a childhood home of Princess Srinagarindra, mother of King Rama VIII and King Rama IX, also a Princess Mother Memorial Park dedicated to her is located nearby. 

The temple was registered as a national historic monument by the Fine Arts Department in 1977.

References

External links
Wat Anongkharam Worawihan

Khlong San district
Buddhist temples in Bangkok
Registered ancient monuments in Bangkok
Religious buildings and structures completed in 1850
19th-century Buddhist temples